Mary Harrod Northend was an American writer specializing in American colonial architecture and home furnishings. She is best known for the thousands of photographs she either took or commissioned to illustrate her books and articles.

Early life 

She was born in Salem, Massachusetts, on May 10, 1850, to William Dummer Northend and Susan Stedman Harrod Northend. Her father, a descendant of colonial governor William Dummer, was a criminal lawyer and a state senator, as well as the author of a history of Massachusetts titled The Bay Colony. Her younger brother was architect William Wheelwright Northend. She suffered from poor health most of her life and missed a great deal of school as a child due to illness. When she took up writing, she was in her fifties.

Career 

Northend began publishing "short historical sketches" in newspapers in the early 1900s, taking photographs with her Kodak camera to illustrate them. Dissatisfied with her own photographs, she eventually hired a professional photographer to come along with her on outings. According to the Anaconda Standard she had over 14,000 photographs to her credit by 1910; due to her "extreme nervousness," she could not physically take the pictures herself, but closely supervised their creation. She published countless photographs in books and periodicals under her own name, and ran a successful business selling images to editors, architects, decorators, and historians. By 1915 she had published in 37 periodicals, including the Boston Herald, the Ladies' Home Journal, and The Century Magazine, The Mentor, and published two books. At first she focused on colonial cookery, furniture, and decorating, later branching out into architecture and landscape. She traveled all over New England, writing about homes and gardens and supervising the photography, often spending hours arranging a single room before a photo shoot.

Death and legacy 

She died at Salem Hospital on December 17, 1926, from surgery made necessary by an auto accident.

Historic New England has collected over 6,000 glass plate negatives and several thousand prints of Northend's photographs. In 2014, her work was included with that of Alice Austin, Edith Guerrier, Ethel Reed, Sara Galner, and Edith Brown in an exhibit at the Boston University Art Gallery titled Craft & Modernity: Professional Women Artists in Boston (1890-1920).

Works

References

Further reading

External links

1850 births
1926 deaths
American women non-fiction writers
20th-century American women writers
Writers from Salem, Massachusetts
20th-century American businesspeople
American women photographers
20th-century American businesswomen